The 2012 CCHA Men's Ice Hockey Tournament is the 41st CCHA Men's Ice Hockey Tournament. It will be played between March 2 and March 17, 2012 at campus locations and at Joe Louis Arena in Detroit, Michigan, United States. Western Michigan won the Mason Cup and they earned the Central Collegiate Hockey Association's automatic bid to the 2012 NCAA Division I Men's Ice Hockey Tournament.

Format
The tournament features four rounds of play. In the first round the sixth and eleventh, seventh and tenth, and eighth and ninth seeds as determined by the final regular season standings play a best-of-three series, with the winners advancing to the quarterfinals. There, the first seed and lowest-ranked first-round winner, the second seed and second-lowest-ranked first-round winner, the third seed and second-highest-ranked first-round winner, and the fourth seed and the fifth seed play a best-of-three series, with the winners advancing to the semifinals. In the semifinals, the highest and lowest seeds and second-highest and second-lowest seeds play a single game, with the winner advancing to the championship game and the loser advancing to the third-place game. The tournament champion receives an automatic bid to the 2012 NCAA Men's Division I Ice Hockey Tournament.

Regular season standings
Note: GP = Games played; W = Wins; L = Losses; T = Ties; PTS = Points; GF = Goals For; GA = Goals Against

Bracket

Semifinals

(3) Western Michigan vs. (4) Miami

(2) Michigan vs. (11) Bowling Green

Third place

(4) Miami vs. (11) Bowling Green

Championship

(2) Michigan vs. (3) Western Michigan

Tournament awards

All-Tournament Team
F Reilly Smith (Miami)
F Greg Squires (Western Michigan)
F Luke Moffatt (Michigan)
D Danny DeKeyser (Western Michigan)
D Lee Moffie (Michigan)
G Frank Slubowski* (Western Michigan)
* Most Valuable Player(s)

References

External links
2012 CCHA Men's Ice Hockey Tournament

CCHA Men's Ice Hockey Tournament
CCHA Men's Ice Hockey Tournament